In January 2022, Jagdish Patel, Vaishaliben Patel, and their children Vihangi and Dharmik died in Emerson, Manitoba, twelve meters away from the United States border. The family were killed by the cold, which reached -35°C around the time of their deaths, as they attempted to emigrate from India to the US, via Canada.

Patel family 
At the time of his death Jagdish Patel was aged 39. He was married to Vaishaliben aged 37 and was travelling with their daughter Vihangi, aged 11 and their son, Dharmik, aged 3. The family were from the village of Dingucha, in Gujarat state, western India; many villagers in Dingucha aspire to emigrate to the US.

The family travelled from India to Toronto on January 12, 2022. Canadian police deduce that they then travelled towards the US border by road, due to the lack of air travel records in the family names, arriving in Emerson, Manitoba on January 18, 2022.

Border crossing attempt and death 
The Patel family and seven others attempted to walk across the border, as part of an immigration scheme. The family were likely unprepared for the low temperatures, which reached -35°C at the time. They were found dead by police in a field in Emerson, Manitoba. The family were described by Canadian authorities as the victims of human trafficking.

Aftermath 
The Patel family's death increased public and media awareness of the Indian people smugglers using Canada as a waypoint to get to the United States. While the Mexico–United States border is heavily guarded, the Canadian border is comparatively easier to walk over.

Police in India arrested two men on January 16, 2022 and charged with crimes including human trafficking and causing death. Several days later, Indian police arrested another suspect.

See also 

 History of immigration to Canada
 Immigration to the United States

References 

January 2022 events in Canada
January 2022 crimes in North America
2022 deaths
Deaths from hypothermia
Human trafficking in Canada
Human trafficking in the United States
Human trafficking in India
2022 in Manitoba
Accidental deaths in Manitoba
History of immigration to the United States